Maap is an island and village and municipality in the state of Yap, Federated States of Micronesia. It lies on the north east of the archipelago of Yap.

References
 Statoids.com, retrieved February 13, 2015

Municipalities of Yap